The Guasasa Formation is a geologic formation in Cuba. It is Tithonian to Early Valanginian in age and contains fossils of ammonites.

Description 
It primarily consists of limestone.

See also 
 List of fossiliferous stratigraphic units in Cuba

References

Further reading 
 
 R. Myczynski. 1989. Ammonite biostratigraphy of the Tithonian of Western Cuba. Annales Societatis Geologorum Poloniae 59:43-125

Geologic formations of Cuba
Jurassic Cuba
Cretaceous Cuba
Shale formations
Limestone formations
Dolomite formations
Shallow marine deposits
Open marine deposits
Formations